Goran Brašnić (born 26 September 1973) is a Bosnian former football goalkeeper and current goalkeeper coach of Riga.

Club career
Brašnić left Troglav Livno in summer 2002 due to the club relegated to the First League of FBiH and joined the new promoted side Žepče. He played in the Premier League of BiH until signed by Prva HNL side Inter Zaprešić in mid of 2005–06 season.

International career
He was called-up to the national squad in September 2003, at age of 29. He earned his second call-up in February 2004, and made his debut in the 85th minute, replacing Almir Tolja and has earned a total of 8 caps, scoring no goals. His final international was a November 2008 friendly match against Slovenia.

Coaching Career
In January 2023 he was appointed goalkeeping coach of Latvian Higher League club Riga, following manager Tomislav Stipić having worked together the previous season at Auda.

References

External links

1973 births
Living people
People from Gradačac
Croats of Bosnia and Herzegovina
Association football goalkeepers
Bosnia and Herzegovina footballers
Bosnia and Herzegovina international footballers
NK Troglav 1918 Livno players
NK Žepče players
NK Inter Zaprešić players
HNK Segesta players
Song Lam Nghe An FC players
Premier League of Bosnia and Herzegovina players
Croatian Football League players
First Football League (Croatia) players
V.League 1 players
Bosnia and Herzegovina expatriate footballers
Expatriate footballers in Croatia
Bosnia and Herzegovina expatriate sportspeople in Croatia
Expatriate footballers in Vietnam
Bosnia and Herzegovina expatriate sportspeople in Latvia
Association football goalkeeping coaches